Peter Christiansen (born 30 January 1975) is a Danish former professional footballer who played as a defender. He is chief scout for Danish Superliga club Randers FC. He started his career with Vejle Boldklub and F.C. Copenhagen in Denmark. Christiansen joined Swedish club Helsingborgs IF in 2005, but after an unsuccessful year at the club, he moved to Randers.

References

External links
Danish national team profile
 Vejle Boldklub profile

1975 births
Living people
Association football defenders
Danish men's footballers
Vejle Boldklub players
F.C. Copenhagen players
Randers FC players
Helsingborgs IF players
Danish Superliga players
Allsvenskan players
Danish expatriate men's footballers
Expatriate footballers in Sweden
People from Hillerød Municipality
Sportspeople from the Capital Region of Denmark